The John and Mary Waterman Jarves House is a historic house at 3 Jarves Street in Sandwich, Massachusetts. The -story Italianate wood-frame house was designed and built by Charles Kirk Kirby in 1857. It was built for John Jarves, founder of the Cape Cod Glass Works, one of the major business in 19th century Sandwich. He was the son of Deming Jarves, founder of the Boston and Sandwich Glass Company.

The house was added to the National Register of Historic Places in 2002, and included in the Jarvesville Historic District in 2010.

See also
National Register of Historic Places listings in Barnstable County, Massachusetts

References

Houses in Barnstable County, Massachusetts
Buildings and structures in Sandwich, Massachusetts
National Register of Historic Places in Barnstable County, Massachusetts
Historic district contributing properties in Massachusetts
Houses on the National Register of Historic Places in Barnstable County, Massachusetts
Houses completed in 1857
Italianate architecture in Massachusetts